Sesilia Takaishvili (30 September 1906 - 21 May 1984) was a Georgian actress. She appeared in more than forty films from 1945 to 1983.

Selected filmography

References

External links 

1906 births
1984 deaths
Film actresses from Georgia (country)